Estrone cyanate, or estrone 3-O-cyanate, also known as estrocyanate, is an estrogen and an estrogen ester – specifically, the 3-O-cyanate ester of estrone – which was investigated for potential use in birth control pills but was found to be of relatively low potency and ultimately was never marketed.

References

Abandoned drugs
Cyanates
Estrogens
Estrone esters